29th Brigade or 29th Infantry Brigade may refer to:

 29th Brigade (Australia)
 29th Infantry Brigade (Greece)
 29th Indian Brigade of the British Indian Army in the First World War 
 29th Indian Infantry Brigade of the British Indian Army in the Second World War 

United Kingdom
 29th (East Anglian) Anti-Aircraft Brigade
 29th Armoured Brigade (United Kingdom)
 29th Infantry Brigade (United Kingdom)
Artillery Brigades
 29th Brigade Royal Field Artillery